The Jackeroo of Coolabong is a 1920 Australian silent film starring renowned Australian sportsman Snowy Baker. It was the last of three films he made with the husband and wife team of director Wilfred Lucas and writer Bess Meredyth, both of whom had been imported from Hollywood.

It is considered a lost film.

Synopsis
Brian O'Farrell (Snowy Baker), is an English 'new chum' who takes a job at an Australian cattle station. He is teased by station hands because of his appearance (including spats and a monocle) but he soon impresses them with his skills at riding and boxing. The station manager, John MacDonald (Wilfred Lucas), takes O'Farrell to Sydney to meet his daughter Edith (Kathleen Key) who is working in the slums. Edith is kidnapped by criminals after witnessing a crime but O'Farrell rescues her. It is later revealed he is the owner of the station.

Cast
Snowy Baker as Brian O'Farrell
Kathleen Key as Edith MacDonald
Wilfred Lucas as John MacDonald
Arthur Tauchert
Bernice Vere
Arthur Greenaway

Production
Kathleen Key was imported from the US to play the female lead.

Shooting took place in June 1920. During filming a kangaroo hunt in Narrabri, an extra, Nellie Park, fell off her horse and died of a fractured skull several days later.

Charles Chauvel worked on the film.

Release
The film was re-edited and released in the USA as The Fighting Breed. Like all the Baker-Meredyth-Lucas collaborations, it was successful at the box office overseas, but returns did not come in quickly.

During filming E. J. Carroll clashed with Wilfred Lucas over the cost of films. Lucas soon returned to Hollywood with Bess Meredyth, taking Baker with them. Raymond Longford took over Carroll's Palmerston studio.

See also
List of lost films

References

External links

The Jackeroo of Coolabong at the National Film and Sound Archive
The Jackeroo of Coolabong at SilentEra
The Fighting Breed at IMDb

1920 films
Australian drama films
Australian silent feature films
Australian black-and-white films
Lost Australian films
Films with screenplays by Bess Meredyth
Films directed by Wilfred Lucas
1920 drama films
1920 lost films
Lost drama films
Silent drama films